Daria Martin (born 1973) is a contemporary American artist and filmmaker based in London and San Francisco since 2002. Working primarily in 16mm film, her work has been exhibited in twenty four solo shows in public galleries including at the Barbican, the Hammer Museum, The New Museum, the Museum of Contemporary Art, Chicago, the Stedelijk Museum and Australian Centre for Contemporary Art. Martin's films address the space between disparate states of being – levels of consciousness, internal and social worlds; subject and object – working to unravel viewer's learned habits of perception. Martin's films also often explore the differences and similarities between other artistic mediums including painting, performance, dance, and sculpture. Some subjects Martin's work touches on include dreams, feminism, inherited trauma, artificial intelligence, and mirror-touch synesthesia.

Biography 
Daria Martin was born in San Francisco, CA. Martin earned a BA in Humanities from Yale University (1995), and an MFA in Art from UCLA (2000). She is represented by Maureen Paley, London. Martin's artistic journey began with abstract paintings, which she describes as "formal and strict." She was drawn to film as she found it gave her the freedom to explore time, space and narrative. Martin's films also often explore the differences and similarities between artistic mediums including painting, performance, dance, and sculpture. Martin's first films drew inspiration from a range of early twentieth-century artists and choreographers such as Oskar Schlemmer, Varvara Stepanova, Alexander Rodchenko. Her films are created organically, often taking on a collaborative process between the selected actors, choreographers and musicians she chooses to work with.

Films 
 In the Palace (2000)
 Birds (2001)
 Closeup Gallery (2003)
 Soft Materials (2004)
 Loneliness and the Modern Pentathlon (2004-2005)
 Wintergarden (2005)
 Harpstrings and Lava (2007)
 Minotaur (2008)
 One of the Things that Makes Me Doubt (2010-2011)
 Sensorium Tests (2012)
 At the Threshold (2014–15)
 Theatre of the Tender (2016)
 A Hunger Artist (2017)
 Tonight the World (2019)

Collections 
Martin's work is in the collections of the Tate, London, the New Museum, New York, the Whitney Museum of American Art, New York, the Museum of Contemporary Art, Chicago, The Hammer Museum, Los Angeles, Arts Council England, London, Kadist Art Foundation, Paris, and Ringier, Zurich.

Awards and residencies 

 2018 - Winner of the 2018 Jarman Award 
 2016 - Welcome Trust Arts Award, London Arts Council Grant for The Arts Oxford
 2014 - AHRC Mid Career Fellowship London
 2012 - Leverhulme Network Award, The Leverhulme Trust, London.
 2010 - Wellcome Trust Arts Award, London.
 2009 - Philip Leverhulme Prize, The Leverhume Trust, London.
 2008 - Wellcome Trust Arts Award, London.
 2008 - Artist in residence, Headlands Center for the Arts, San Francisco.
 2007 - Artist in residence, The Watermill Center, New York.
 2002 - Artist in residence, Delfina Studios Trust, London.
 1999 - Artist in residence, Cite Internationale des Arts, Paris

References

External links
 dariamartin.com

1973 births
American contemporary artists
Living people
American filmmakers
Yale University alumni
University of California, Los Angeles alumni